Jalan Kebun Teh (Jawi: جالن کبون تيه) is a major road in Johor Bahru, Johor, Malaysia.

Features
 The Malaysian Public Works Department (JKR) Johor main headquarters is located here.
 Many cemeteries along this road.
 Tanjung Kupang Memorial
 The existing road will be upgraded into a six-lane elevated highway linking the Tebrau Highway (Federal Route 3) on the east and the Skudai Highway (Federal Route 1) on the west known as JB East–West Link.

List of junctions

Roads in Johor Bahru